The concept of linguistic relativity concerns the relationship between language and thought, specifically whether language influences thought, and, if so, how. This question has led to research in multiple disciplines—including anthropology, cognitive science, linguistics, and philosophy. Among the most debated theories in this area of work is the Sapir–Whorf hypothesis. This theory states that the language a person speaks will affect the way that this person thinks. The theory varies between two main proposals: that language structure determines how individuals perceive the world and that language structure influences the world view of speakers of a given language but does not determine it.

There are two formal sides to the color debate, the universalist and the relativist. The universalist side claims that the biology of all human beings is all the same, so the development of color terminology has absolute universal constraints. The relativist side asserts that the variability of color terms cross-linguistically points to more culture-specific phenomena. Because color exhibits both biological and linguistic aspects, it has become a focus of the study of the relationship between language and thought. In a 2006 review of the debate Paul Kay and Terry Regier concluded that "There are universal constraints on color naming, but at the same time, differences in color naming across languages cause differences in color cognition and/or perception."

The color debate was made popular in large part due to Brent Berlin and Paul Kay's famous 1969 study and their subsequent publishing of Basic Color Terms: Their Universality and Evolution.  Although much on color terminology has been done since Berlin and Kay's famous study, other research predates it, including the mid-nineteenth century work of William Ewart Gladstone and Lazarus Geiger, which also predates the Sapir–Whorf hypothesis, as well as the work of Eric Lenneberg and Roger Brown in 1950s and 1960s.

Universalist view

Berlin and Kay 
The universalist theory that color cognition is an innate, physiological process rather than a cultural one was introduced in 1969 by Brent Berlin and Paul Kay in their book Basic Color Terms: Their Universality and Evolution.  Their study was intended to challenge the formerly prevailing theory of linguistic relativity set forth by Edward Sapir and Benjamin Lee Whorf. Berlin and Kay found universal restrictions on the number of basic color terms (BCTs) that a language can have, and on the ways the language can use these terms. The study included data collected from speakers of twenty different languages from a range of language families. Berlin and Kay identified eleven possible basic color categories: white, black, red, green, yellow, blue, brown, purple, pink, orange, and gray. To be considered a basic color category, the term for the color in each language had to meet certain criteria:

 It is monolexemic (for example, red, not red-yellow or yellow-red.)
 It is monomorphemic (for example, blue, but not bluish)
 Its signification is not included in that of any other color term (for example, crimson is a type of red)
 Its application must not be restricted to a narrow class of objects (for example, blonde is restricted to hair, wood and beer)
 It must be psychologically salient for informants (for example, "the color of grandma's freezer" is not psychologically salient for all speakers)

In case of doubt, the following "subsidiary criteria" were implemented:
 The doubtful form should have the same distributional potential as the previously established basic color terms (for example, objects can be described as reddish but not salmonish)
 Color terms that are also the name of an object characteristically having that color are suspect, for example, gold, silver and ash
 Recent foreign loan words may be suspect
 In cases where lexemic status is difficult to assess, morphological complexity is given some weight as a secondary criterion (for example, red-orange might be questionable)

Berlin and Kay also found that, in languages with fewer than the maximum eleven color categories, the colors followed a specific evolutionary pattern. This pattern is as follows:

 All languages contain terms for black and white.
 If a language contains three terms, then it contains a term for red.
 If a language contains four terms, then it contains a term for either green or yellow (but not both).
 If a language contains five terms, then it contains terms for both green and yellow.
 If a language contains six terms, then it contains a term for blue.
 If a language contains seven terms, then it contains a term for brown.
 If a language contains eight or more terms, then it contains terms for purple, pink, orange or gray.

In addition to following this evolutionary pattern absolutely, each of the languages studied also selected virtually identical focal hues for each color category present. For example, the term for "red" in each of the languages corresponded to roughly the same shade in the Munsell color system.  Consequently, they posited that the cognition, or perception, of each color category is also universal.

Additional universalist arguments 
A later study supporting this universal, physiological theory was done by Kessen, Bornstein, and Weiskopf. In this study, sixteen four-month-old infants were presented with lights of different frequencies corresponding to different colors.  The lengths of habituation were measured and found to be longer when the infant was presented with successive hues surrounding a certain focal color than with successive focal colors.  This pattern of response is what is expected when the infants are distinguishing between the focal colors, but not distinguishing between successive hues (i.e. different shades of red are all "red" but "blue" and "red" focal colors are different).  This is to say that infants respond to different hues of color in much the same way as adults do, demonstrating the presence of color vision at an age younger than previously expected.  Kessen, Bornstein and Weiskopf therefore claim that the ability to perceive the same distinct focal colors is present even in small children.

Research before Berlin and Kay (1969)

Gladstone and Geiger 
In their paper Language and thought: Which side are you on anyway?, Regier et al. discuss the presence of a universalist perspective on the color debate in the mid-nineteenth century.

In the mid-nineteenth century, various scholars, notably William Gladstone (1858) and Lazarus Geiger (1880), noted that the speakers of ancient written languages did not name colors as precisely and consistently – as they saw it – as the speakers of modern European languages. They proposed a universal evolutionary sequence in which color vocabulary evolves in tandem with an assumed biological evolution of the color sense

Gladstone was a Homeric scholar and in his writings, notably Studies on Homer and the Homeric Age, expressed that, because there was virtually a lack of color terminology in Homeric Greek literature, Greeks could probably not see color the same way people see color today.

... that the organ of color and its impressions were but partially developed among the Greeks of the heroic age

Geiger expanded on Gladstone's ideas by looking at other classic works and hypothesized that man gradually became aware of color over time. He posited the idea that this awareness was connected to the order colors came up in the spectrum, starting with longest wavelengths.

Lenneberg and Roberts 
Lenneberg and Roberts presented their paper The Denotata of Color Terms at the Linguistic Society of America in 1953. In this paper they reported their findings on color recall in Zuni speakers. Zuni has one color term for yellow and orange, and Lenneberg and Roberts' study reported that Zuni speakers encountered greater difficulty in color recall for these colors than English speakers, who have available terms to distinguish them. Brown and Lenneberg attributed this effect to the property of codability.

Linguistic codability is whether naming an object is difficult or not. It also includes a focus on the effect that naming can have on behavior and cognition.

Brown and Lenneberg 
Brown and Lenneberg published A Study in Language and Cognition in 1954, in which they discussed the effect of codability on recognition. In their experiment they used a series of Munsell chips to test color recall and recognition in English speakers. Their findings suggested that the availability of a basic color term in a given language affected the retention of that color in recall testing. Brown and Lenneberg linked their study to Lenneberg and Roberts' 1953 findings on color recall in Zuni speakers.

Relativist view 
Initially, Berlin and Kay's theory received little direct criticism. But in the decades since their 1969 book, a significant scholarly debate has developed surrounding the universalism of color terminology. Many relativists find significant issues with this universalism. Discussed below, Barbara Saunders and John A. Lucy are two scholars who are prominent advocates of the opposing relativist position. Also, Daniel Everett's work on the Pirahã language of the Brazilian Amazon, a controversial case, found several peculiarities, including what he interpreted as the Pirahã language's lack of color terms in the way those are otherwise defined. Everett's conclusions were met with skepticism from universalists, who claimed that the linguistic deficit is explained by the lack of need for such concepts.

Barbara Saunders 
Barbara Saunders believes that Berlin and Kay's theory of basic color terminology contains several unspoken assumptions and significant flaws in research methodology. Included in these assumptions is an ethnocentric bias based on traditions of Western scientific and philosophical thought. She regards the evolutionary component of Berlin and Kay's theory as "an endorsement of the idea of progress" and references Smart's belief that it is "a Eurocentric narrative that filters everything through the West and its values and exemplifies a universal evolutionary process of modernization."

With regard to Berlin and Kay's research, Saunders criticizes the translation methods used for the color terms they gathered from the 78 languages they had not studied directly. Like many others, she also questions the effectiveness of using the Munsell color system in the elicitation of color terminology and identification of focal hues. She feels that "use of this chart exemplifies one of the mistakes commonly made by the social sciences: that of taking data-sets as defining a (laboratory) phenomenon which supposedly represents the real world", and entails "taking a picture of the world for the world and then claiming that that picture is the concept". Finally, she takes issue with the anomalous cases of color term use that she believes Berlin, Kay and Merrifield disregarded in their work on the World Color Survey for the purpose of purifying their results.

In Saunders' 1997 article with van Brakel, they criticize the amount of weight given to the study of physiological color perception as support for the universalism of color terminology. They primarily criticize the idea that there is an autonomous neuro-physiological color pathway, citing a lack of concrete evidence for its existence.

Saunders is also bothered by the overall de-contextualization of color terminology and the failure of universalists to address the limitations of their methodologies. She points out that:

Ordinary colour talk is used in a variety of ways – for flat coloured surfaces, surfaces of natural objects, patches of paintings, transparent objects, shining objects, the sky, flames, illumination, vapours, volumes, films and so on, all of which interact with overall situation, illumination, edges, textures, patternings and distances, making the concept of sameness of colour inherently indeterminate.

John Lucy 
John A. Lucy's criticisms of Berlin and Kay's theory are similar to those of Saunders and other relativists, primarily focusing on shortcomings in research methodologies and the assumptions that underlie them.

Lucy believes that there are problems with how linguistic analysis has been used to characterize the meanings of color terms across languages. Referential range (what a color term can refer to) and grammatical distribution (how the term can be used) are two dimensions Lucy believes are critical to defining the meaning of a term, both of which "are routinely ignored in research on color terms which focuses primarily on denotational overlap across languages without any consideration of the typical use of the terms or their formal status." He also feels that any attempt to contrast color term systems requires understanding of each individual language and the systems it uses to structure reference.

Lucy also believes that there is significant bias present in the design of Berlin and Kay's research, due to their English-speaking and Western points of view. He thinks the use of the Munsell color system demonstrates their adherence to the ideas that "speech is about labeling accuracy" and that "Meaning is really about accurate denotation," which he believes "...both derive directly from the folk understandings of English speakers about how their language works." He refers to Conklin's study of Hanunóo as a demonstration of what a study might reveal about a language's color term system when such bias is not present. He demonstrates that "an 'adequate knowledge' of the system would never have been produced by restricting the stimuli to color chips and the task of labeling" (original emphasis).

In summation, he feels that the approach universalists have taken in researching color term universals sets up a procedure that "...guarantees both their discovery and their form," and that, "It does not really even matter whether the researchers involved are open-minded and consciously willing to recognize relativism as a possible outcome—because the universalist conclusion is guaranteed by their methodological assumptions."

Recent scholarship 
Scholarship on color vision has proceeded in three principal domains within the last twenty years.  There have been revisions to the Berlin and Kay hypothesis; in response, there have been continued challenges to that hypothesis; and lastly, the field of vision science has expanded to explore hue categorization at a perceptual level, independent of language-based distinctions, possibly offering compromise in the two polar theories.

Revisions of the Berlin and Kay hypothesis 
In 1999 Paul Kay and Luisa Maffi published an article entitled Color Appearance and the Emergence and Evolution of Basic Color Lexicons, in which they outline a series of revisions in response to data collected in the World Color Survey (WCS) and to Stephen Levinson and his work on the language Yélî Dnye in Papua New Guinea (see below). While upholding an evolutionary track for the addition of basic color terms (BCTs) to any given lexicon, they outlined a series of three Partition Rules (i.e., superordinate rules that determine the evolution of BCTs):

 Black and White (Bk&W): Distinguish black and white.
 Warm and Cool (Wa&C): Distinguish the warm primaries (red and yellow) from the cool primaries (green and blue).
 Red: Distinguish red.

The ordering of these rules is reflective of the data of the overwhelming majority of languages studied in the WCS. However, exceptions do exist, as was accounted for by Yélî Dnye and other languages within the WCS. Furthermore, they also propose a 0) rule, one which simply states: partition. Such a rule is necessary to motivate the specification of later basic color terms, namely those that can no longer be brought about by application of rules 1)–3).

With respect to the evolution of color terms within a given lexicon, Kay and Maffi further outlined the possibilities of different trajectories of evolution, though all of those numerically possible are not attested in the World Color Survey. Another significant contribution of this article is a discussion of the Emergence Hypothesis (see below), its relation to Yélî Dnye, and its motivation for the authors' revision of evolutionary trajectories.

Using a phylogenetic approach, Bowern & Haynie found support for Berlin & Kay hypothesis in the Pama-Nyungan language family, as well as other alternative trajectories for gaining and losing color terms.

Opposition to Berlin and Kay et al. 
There are three approaches to such criticisms:

 Those brought about by implications within the taxonomic structure of the B&K model (as seen further in Berlin's treatment of ethnobiological systems of classification)
 Those as seen in research in color perception in children and infants
 Those brought about by specific fieldwork

Levinson and Yélî Dnye 
The Yele language is a language isolate spoken on Rossel Island in Papua New Guinea.  Among observations about the class, derivation, usage of, and disagreement over, color naming words in Yele is a critique of the BCT-model's assumption that languages which have not yet fully lexicalized the semantic space of color (as was posited to be universal in the original and subsequent B&K papers [1969 &1978]) with the use of all eleven basic color names do so by use of the fewer composite terms that they do possess (by B&K's criteria for Yele, three).  As Stephen Levinson argues using methodology similar to that used by B&K for their initial tests and later for the WCS, there are simply regions of the color spectrum for which Yele has no name, and which are not subsumed by larger composite categories, even despite the inventive nature of color terms in Yele that fall outside the criteria for "basic" status. Given the fact that such color naming words are extremely inventive, (a "semi-productive" mode of adjectival derivation is the duplication of related nouns), Levinson argues that this is highly detrimental to the BCT-theory, insomuch that Yele is "a language where a semantic field of color has not yet jelled", and thus one not open to universal constraint.

As Levinson points out, there is evidence that supports the emergence of BCTs through physical objects and words used to signify simultaneous properties such as lightness. As such, these terms do not cohere as a unique, separable semantic domain denoting hue (see Bornstein for this criterion). Over time, though, and through processes of semantic change, such a domain can emerge. In response to work by Levinson and Lyons, Kay dubs this perspective the Emergence Hypothesis (EH). (See Levinson's article for a discussion on the co-existing evolutionary tracks for color words if one accepts both B&K's position and the Emergence Hypothesis.) Kay & Maffi (1999) incorporate the EH into their evolutionary track by removing from their model the assumption that languages begin by fully segmenting the color spectrum.  This inverts their Partition Principles (see above), namely by placing 1) and 3) over 0) and 2).  That is, languages partially segment the space into black, white, and red (i.e., 1) & 3)), and then the assignment to partition (0)) and split warm and cool colors (2)) accommodates the rest of the space.  As Kay & Maffi explain, this is essential to explications of Y/G/Bu terms (e.g., Cree), which were previously incompatible with the model. However, this model also introduces the possibility for previously divergent evolutionary paths for color terms, since it is only after the rearrangement and reassignment of the Partition Principles that a language that derived from EH origins joins with a language that originally partitioned the whole of the color spectrum.

Anna Wierzbicka and universals of visual semantics 
In an article titled The Semantics of Colour: A New Paradigm, Wierzbicka discusses three main critiques of the universalist approach:

 The inability to prove the existence of true color terms (i.e., those based on variations in hue) in languages that lack a superordinate word for color in their taxonomies
 The lack of inquiry into the semantic range of any given language's assumed color naming.
 That the Western universalist tradition "[imposes] on other languages and cultures one's own conceptual grid" and does not reflect " 'the native's point of view'", citing Malinowski in the latter.

With regard to 1), she states that "the basic point ... is that, in many languages, one cannot ask the question, 'What color is it?'"  The assumption oscillates between two versions: on the one hand she argues that languages with no superordinate word for color simply do not have minimal color terms. On the other hand, she argues that even if one contests the first point (i.e., agree that languages that lack a word for color still have color terms), the fact that one cannot ask the question she posits (above) means that color is not a salient semantic domain in these languages. In the structure of her Natural Semantic Metalanguage, color does not constitute a semantic "primitive", though she argues for many others cross-linguistically. (For more on the NSM related to color terms, see Theoretical Linguistics 29:3.)

Pitchford and Mullen: The developmental acquisition of basic colour terms
This study compares the evolutionary model of color terms of Berlin and Kay to the acquisition of color terms in children (something which has been thought to lag behind other lexical acquisitions). Their study proceeds to three main questions:

 Are color terms acquired late?
 Are basic color terms acquired in a fixed developmental order?
 What factors may influence the acquisition of basic color terms?

With regard to 1), they find that color terms are not acquired any later than other relevant lexemes to distinguish objects. It had been thought, for example, that since color is not necessarily unique to a given object, and diverse objects are more likely to share common color than a common shape, that color terms lagged behind shape terms in development. This was found not to be the case.

Second, they found no correlation between the order of color term acquisition in children and in languages generally. It was found that gray and brown are learned later in development; there was no preference for the six primary color terms over the remaining three secondary ones. The similarity between the acquisition of these terms in children and in language vocabularies was assumed to be comparable, since even in current notions of the B&K hypothesis the evolutionary order of color terms is thought to be based on universals of neurophysiology. While some studies in neurophysiology have shown greater salience for the basic color terms (and thus correlate their earlier evolutionary status), neurophysiology has not been able to account for such phenomena as intuitive separations of warm and cool colors (the second partition rule posited by Kay [see above] is essential to such early-onset warm/cool distinctions, yet is overridden in language with a yellow/green/blue color term).

Vision science and theoretical compatibility 
Marc Bornstein's essay Hue Categorization and Color Naming: Physics to Sensation to Perception separates an analytical review of vision science and color naming into three sections:

 Categorization and its aids to both perceptual and cognitive functions generally
 Color vision and hue categorization
 Color naming (an unarticulated derivative of the first two ideas [see his companion essay Hue Categorization and Color Naming: Cognition to Language to Culture for a further discussion of this point])

As a result, he summarizes both the findings of vision science (as it relates to color naming) and the linking of three separate but causally related processes within the study of color naming phenomena.  He states that "the physics of color, the psychophysics of color discrimination, and the psychology of color naming are not isomorphic".  The color spectrum clearly exists at a physical level of wavelengths (inter al.), humans cross-linguistically tend to react most saliently to the primary color terms (a primary motive of Bornstein's work and vision science generally) as well as select similar exemplars of these primary color terms, and lastly comes the process of linguistic color naming, which adheres both to universal patterns but demonstrates individual uniqueness.  While one may have origins in its predecessor, variation among test subjects in vision science and linguistic variation demonstrate that it is not a process of whole causality.  In his companion essay, he demonstrates that this process of causality may indeed be reversed, which he explains through a set of "models of development":

 Undeveloped
 Partially developed
 Fully developed

In response, there are three ways that outside experience may affect this development: through (A) induction, (B) modification, or (C) deprivation.  Thus the logical possibilities are 1A & 1C; 2A, 2B & 2C; and 3B & 3C.  Using this format, he explains that developmental altering in hue categories "entail perceptual 'sharpening' and 'broadening'".  He attributes this to either "maturation" (perceptually) or "experience".  Such a conclusion is necessarily indeterminate because understanding of why certain hue categories are lost and others induced (cf. developmental processes above) "requires further exacting research".  Coming from these two perspectives (i.e., those outlined in the causation above, and the models of development), this leads Bornstein to conclude that "there appear to be nontrivial biological constraints on color categorization [and that] ... the available evidence seems compatible with a position of moderate universality that leads to expectations of probabilistic rather than deterministic cross-cultural correspondence", and that "in color, relativism appears to overlay a universalist foundation".

Probabilistic inference 
Probabilistic inference uses probabilistic models that describe the problem in terms of probability theory and probability distributions. The research article "The Sapir-Whorf Hypothesis and Probabilistic Inference: Evidence from the Domain of Color" seeks to clarify the argument through the lens of probabilistic inference. The probabilistic model is a conjunction of both a universal color space and a language-specific categorical organization of that space. This approach realizes that color cognition involves an interaction between these two tiers. There are incursions of linguistic categorization into nonlinguistic processes of thinking, and taking the Sapir-Whorf hypothesis does not necessarily entail a complete rejection of the universal components of human cognition. The probabilistic model is useful because many findings to support the Sapir-Whorf hypothesis do not replicate reliably. Framing the issue in terms of probabilistic inference addresses this issue by highlighting the role of uncertainty.

Nonlinguistic influences on color memory 
It is unlikely that linguistic factors are the sole component to differences in color perception across cultures. The culture differences in color naming and color perception can be extended to nonlinguistic factors. Color in the environment determines the language individuals of that group use in colloquial conversation. Thus, the communicability scores of color categories depends partly on the language, and even more so on the salient objects in the environment. In other words, for colors to be differentiated, they have to be already readily available in the individual or cultural group's environment.

Color significance across cultures 
The significance of colors differs widely from culture to culture, which in turn affects the perception of different color hues between different nation-states. Cultures assign different meanings to colors due to religious influences and social beliefs.  Differences in color categorization between languages are caused by differences in the overall usefulness of color to a culture or language group.  Different areas of the world can differ widely in environment and the colors readily available in that environment. These environmental differences can also have an influence on color naming. The saliency and use of objects in a culture provides direct contribution to the color significance and color naming in that culture.

Red

 India: A married woman can be identified by red henna on her hands and sindoor worn along her hairline.
 South Africa: The red section of the South African flag symbolizes violence and sacrifices that were made during the struggle for independence.
 Thailand: Red is the color for Sundays and is linked with Surya, the solar god.
 China: Red is worn during New Year and wedding celebrations, as well as being the main color for decorations for such events.

Yellow

 France: In the 10th century, the French painted the doors of traitors and criminals yellow.
 China: "Yellow picture" or "yellow book" is used to discuss publication or media related to pornographic images and websites. Yellow was considered a color exclusive to royalty and only the emperor was allowed to wear yellow clothes during Ming and Qing Dynasties.
 Africa: Yellow is reserved for people of high rank because of its resemblance to the color of gold.
 Egyptians: Used yellow to paint mummies and tombs before the deceased were sent to the afterlife.
 Japan: Yellow represents bravery, wealth, and refinement since the War of the Dynasties in 1357.

Blue

 English language: The feeling of melancholy is typically referred to as having "the blues"
 United States: Many American banks such as Citi and Bank of America use blue for their logo to symbolize trust, security and authority.
 Middle East: Blue signifies safety and protection, and it is a symbol of heaven, spirituality and immortality.
 Christianity: Virgin Mary is traditionally portrayed in blue.
 Hinduism: The color of Krishna, the most highly worshipped Hindu god who embodies love and joy.

See also 
Eskimo words for snow
Distinction of blue and green in various languages

References

Further reading 
 Various (2005).  Journal of Cognition and Culture 5:3–4. BRILL
 Various (2005).  Cross-Cultural Research 39:1–2.
 Biggam, C. P. (2012). The Semantics of Colour. A Historical Approach. Cambridge University Press, Cambridge [etc.]. .
 
 Jones, William Jervis (2013). German Colour Terms: A study in their historical evolution from earliest times to the present. John Benjamins, Amsterdam & Philadelphia. .
 
 
 MacLaury, Robert E. (1997).  Color and Cognition in Mesoamerica: Constructing Categories as Vantages.  Austin: University of Texas Press.
 
 
 Seidner, Stanley S.(1982). Ethnicity, Language, and Power from a Psycholinguistic Perspective. Bruxelles: Centre de recherche sur le pluralinguisme.
 
  Deutscher, Guy (2010).  Through the language glass: how words colour your world,  William Heinemann.

Anthropological linguistics
Color in culture
Color names
Cognitive linguistics
Language comparison
Philosophy of language